SeaTac  is a city in southern King County, Washington, United States. The city is an inner-ring suburb of Seattle and part of the Seattle metropolitan area. The name "SeaTac" is derived from the Seattle–Tacoma International Airport, itself a portmanteau of Seattle and Tacoma.

The city includes the communities of Angle Lake, Bow Lake, McMicken Heights and Riverton Heights, which were established before the city's incorporation. Residents voted for incorporation on March 14, 1989, and the city incorporated in February 1990.

History

The Highline area, which includes modern-day SeaTac, Burien, most of Des Moines, and unincorporated communities such as White Center and Boulevard Park, was settled by European Americans in the mid-1850s. The federal government finished construction of a military road from Fort Steilacoom to Fort Bellingham in 1860, passing through the Highline area to the east of modern-day SeaTac. One of the more prominent roads of travel from Seattle to Tacoma early in the 20th century is Des Moines Memorial Drive (originally called the High Line road), which passes directly through the middle of the region, particularly through SeaTac and Burien especially.

Incorporating the area as a city was proposed by local residents in the 1980s, while a competing proposal sought annexation into Des Moines or another city. Local residents voted for incorporation on March 14, 1989, and the city incorporated on February 28, 1990. Des Moines amended their annexation territory following the decision. The original ballot used the name "Sea-Tac", but the incorporation petition to the county government omitted the hyphen. In 2014, Gavin Kelly of The Resolution Foundation wrote that "A generation ago SeaTac was what Americans would call a middle-class town. A jet-fueller or baggage handler could earn a decent living."

Government and infrastructure

Local government

SeaTac is governed by a city council which consists of seven elected councilpersons. The city "has contracted with the King County Sheriff's Office for law enforcement since incorporation in 1990." Deputies assigned to SeaTac wear city uniforms and drive patrol cars marked with the city logo. There are currently 51 patrol officers, detectives, and support staff assigned full-time to the city.

In January 2014 the SeaTac Fire Department entered a 20-year contract with Kent Fire Department Regional Fire Authority (RFA) to form the Puget Sound Regional Fire Authority. SeaTac's three fire stations, Station 45, 46, and 47, joined Kent's Station 73 to make up RFA's West Battalion.

The Seatac Municipal Court, located in the City Hall, is a court of limited jurisdiction. The judge is authorized by the Revised Code of Washington to preside over civil infractions, traffic infractions, criminal misdemeanor and gross misdemeanor violations, and civil orders for protection.

Public Works is responsible for planning, design, construction and maintenance of streets, transportation improvements, surface water utility, and solid waste and recycling programs.

In 2013, voters in the city narrowly passed a minimum wage of $15 per hour for employees of airport-related businesses, such as hotels, parking lots and car rental agencies. In a later appeals court decision, the $15 minimum wage was reversed for employees working entirely on Port of Seattle property within the city limits but still applies to employees of airport-related businesses in the city proper. Union workshops are exempt from the $15 minimum wage. However, the Washington Supreme Court in August 2015 reversed the King County Superior Court ruling, which said that SeaTac did not have authority to set a minimum wage at the airport. The Supreme Court rejected the argument that the wage did not apply because the airport is owned by the Port of Seattle. The Court stated that Proposition 1 can be enforced at Seattle–Tacoma International Airport because there is no indication that it will interfere with airport operations and that federal labor law does not preempt the provision protecting workers from retaliation.

Federal government presence

The Riverton Heights Post Office is located in the city.

The National Transportation Safety Board operates the Seattle Aviation Field Office in the city.

The Federal Bureau of Prisons operates the Federal Detention Center, SeaTac in SeaTac.

Economy

The city is home to over 900 licensed businesses, nearly 80 of which are Fortune 1000 companies. They employ nearly 40,000 employees in the city of SeaTac and generate local sales of approximately $3.7 billion.

Alaska Airlines and Horizon Air are headquartered in the city. Four airlines have operations at 18000 Pacific Highway South (also known as 18000 International Boulevard) in the city, including Asiana Airlines, EVA Air, Hainan Airlines, and China Airlines.

Economic development
SeaTac's Department of Community and Economic Development was formed in early 2011 to create a one-stop permitting center, increase the level of service and assist in the facilitation of economic development by creating a more cohesive approach to real estate development and job creation. The new department has four divisions: Economic Development, Planning, Engineering Review, and Building Services.
In 2013, the City of SeaTac Proposition No. 1 passed with 50.64% of the vote to raise the minimum wage to $15 per hour.

Geography and climate
SeaTac is located at  (47.441406, -122.293077).

Surrounding cities

Demographics

As of 2000 the median income for a household in the city was $41,202, and the median income for a family was $47,630. Males had a median income of $34,396 versus $28,984 for females. The per capita income for the city was $19,717. About 9.8% of families and 11.5% of the population were below the poverty line, including 15.5% of those under age 18 and 8.1% of those age 65 or over.

SeaTac's population has grown steadily since the 2000 Census, and is projected to grow 5.06% by 2022, a rate higher than the US rate of 3.77%, but lower than King County's 7.46%. SeaTac has considerable ethnic diversity. Only 51.76% of the age 5+ population reportedly spoke only English at home; some 13.90% spoke Spanish at home, considerably higher than King County's 6.82%, but only somewhat higher than the US's overall 13.16%. Languages spoken at home also include those from Asia-Pacific at 10.74%, Indo-European languages at 10.06%, and other languages at 13.54%.

2010 census
As of the census of 2010, there were 26,909 people, 9,533 households, and 5,913 families residing in the city. The racial makeup of the city was 45.9% White (39.5% Non-Hispanic White), 16.8% African American, 1.5% Native American, 14.5% Asian, 3.6% Pacific Islander, 11.6% from other races, and 6.0% from two or more races. Hispanic or Latino of any race were 20.3% of the population.

There were 9,533 households, of which 33.2% had children under the age of 18 living with them, 40.6% were married couples living together, 14.0% had a female householder with no husband present, 7.4% had a male householder with no wife present, and 38.0% were non-families. 28.8% of all households were made up of individuals, and 7.5% had someone living alone who was 65 years of age or older. The average household size was 2.72 and the average family size was 3.38.

The median age in the city was 34.5 years. 23.1% of residents were under the age of 18; 10.3% were between the ages of 18 and 24; 31.8% were from 25 to 44; 25.2% were from 45 to 64; and 9.7% were 65 years of age or older. The gender makeup of the city was 52.4% male and 47.6% female.

Education

Primary and secondary schools

Highline Public Schools is the school district with the majority of the city in its boundaries. Elementary schools serving the Highline sections of the city include Bow Lake Elementary School in SeaTac, Madrona Elementary School in SeaTac, McMicken Heights Elementary School in SeaTac, and Cedarhurst Elementary School in Burien. Most residents are zoned to Chinook Middle School and Tyee Educational Complex in the city, while some are zoned to Sylvester Middle School and Highline High School in Burien. With the opening of Glacier Middle School in north SeaTac, residents north of the airport are generally zoned there and subsequently to Highline High School given the proximity of that area to Burien.

Tyee Educational Complex housing three independent schools: The Academy of Citizenship and Empowerment, and Odyssey: The Essential School. It then has been transformed back to Tyee High School - a single school in the 2017–18 school year.

In 2004, Highline Public Schools reorganized some of its high schools, including Tyee, into having smaller programs on larger campuses.

Small portions of SeaTac are in the Kent School District and the Renton School District.

Public libraries
The King County Library System operates the Valley View Library in SeaTac.

Parks and recreation

The city operates seven city parks and operates two community center facilities.

Angle Lake Park, a  park at Angle Lake, has a barbecue area, a boat launch, a fishing pier, playground equipment, an open recreation area, swimming facilities, a stage, toilet facilities, and a spray park. In the swimming area lifeguards are on duty during the summer months.

Bow Lake Park, a  park, consists of open space.

The  Grandview Park, an off leash dog area, has open areas, benches, fencing, a kiosk, waste receptacles, "sani-cans," and trails.

The  McMicken Heights Park has an open area, playground equipment, and tennis courts.

The Neighborhood Park at SeaTac Community Center has a half court basketball court a skate park, playground equipment, a picnic area, a climbing boulder, and parking.

The  North SeaTac Park has the SeaTac Community Center, baseball, soccer (football), and softball fields, a disk golf course, an outdoor basketball court, an open area, playground equipment, a picnic shelter, toilet facilities, BMX track and paved walking trails.

The  Sunset Park has baseball/softball fields, soccer fields, tennis courts, toilet facilities, and paved walking trails.

The  Valley Ridge Park has baseball/softball fields with synthetic turf, outdoor basketball courts, a community center, a hockey court, playground equipment, a skate park, soccer fields with synthetic turf, tennis courts, toilet facilities.

The Tyee Valley Golf Course is an 18-hole golf course and also served as the 1988 and 1989 USA Cross Country Championships running course.

Transportation
SeaTac is served by three major highways: State Route 99 (International Boulevard), State Route 518, and the Airport Expressway. Portions of Interstate 5 and State Route 509 also lie within the city limits.

Airports
The city is served by the Seattle–Tacoma International Airport, located within city limits.

Public transportation
The city is also served by several public transportation services: Link light rail stops at two stations in the city, at SeaTac/Airport station and Angle Lake station; King County Metro operates several bus routes in the area, including the RapidRide A Line on International Boulevard and RapidRide F Line on Southcenter Boulevard; some Sound Transit Express regional bus routes terminate or serve the SeaTac area, primarily the airport and other transit hubs.

Notable people

 Mark Driscoll, evangelical pastor
 Mia Gregerson, member of the Washington House of Representatives
 Tally Hall, soccer player
 Julia Patterson, former member of the Washington State Legislature and King County Council
 Adam Smith, member of the U.S. House of Representatives
 Doug Sutherland, former mayor of Tacoma and Washington State Commissioner of Public Lands

See also

 List of cities in Washington
 Highline Botanical Garden
 Robert Morris Earthwork

Notes

References

External links

 
Cities in Washington (state)
Cities in King County, Washington
Cities in the Seattle metropolitan area
Former census-designated places in Washington (state)
Populated places established in 1990
1990 establishments in Washington (state)